Imeni Vasylya Nesvita (Named after Vasyl Nesvit, Vasyl Nesvit's, Ukrainian: Імені Василя Несвіта), until 2012 Hrebinnykivka is a railway station near Verkhnya Syrovatka, Sumy Oblast, Ukraine. The station is at a junction of the Imeni Vasylya Nesvita-Nyzy and Basy-Boromlya lines of the Sumy Directorate of Southern Railways.

The station is located between Syrovatka ( away) and Boromlya ( away) stations.

History

The station was opened on December 22, 1913, under the name Hrebinnykivka.

On October 8, 2012, the station was renamed in honor of the former head of Southern Railways Vasyl Nesvit.

Passenger service

On November 16, 2010, the movement of railcars was opened on the Hrebinnykivka (now Imeni Vasylya Nesvita) - Nyzy line. But despite the low fare of the rail bus, it was unused, and was soon canceled.

Passenger and suburban trains stop at the station.

Notes

 Tariff Guide No. 4. Book 1 (as of 05/15/2021) (Russian) Archived 05/15/2021.

References

External links
Imeni Vasylya Nesvita station on railwayz.info
Schedule for passenger trains
Schedule for suburban trains

Railway stations in Sumy Oblast
Sumy
Buildings and structures in Sumy Oblast